Are You Sleeping may refer to:
 the nursery rhyme Frère Jacques
 Truth Be Told (2019 TV series), a mystery TV series on Apple TV+ originally titled Are You Sleeping?